The HS2 automated people mover is a planned people mover in Solihull, England being built in conjunction with the High Speed 2 project in order to improve connections between HS2's upcoming Interchange station, Birmingham Airport, and other rail and community infrastructure.

History 
Renderings of the people mover were revealed in July 2019 and Schedule 17 approval was granted in 2020. Revised plans for the people mover were submitted to Solihull Council on 3 February 2022, with the altered alignment of an approximately  section, developed in conjunction with the Urban Growth Company (of Solihull Council). This would allow for possible future commercial developments and a proposed redevelopment of Birmingham International railway station, as well as including additional planting and artwork. These plans were approved on 29 April 2022.

Specification 
The eastern terminus of the proposed route is Birmingham Interchange, a station on High Speed 2. The line will run west to Birmingham Airport with intermediate stops at the National Exhibition Centre and Birmingham International railway station, a stop on the West Coast Main Line.

As the system will be automated, a walkway will be provided along the length of the route for emergency and trackside access.

A maintenance facility will be built close to the main viaduct next to the M42 motorway.

Although sections are double tracked at intermediate stops and to allow passing, significant sections of the route are single tracked in a pinched loop configuration. Structures are being built to allow for both self-propelled and cable-pulled people movers to provide future flexibility in operation and for tenders.

Services are expected to use approximately  vehicles running every three minutes and will take six minutes end-to-end between Birmingham Airport and Interchange station, with a throughput capacity of 2,100 passengers per hour in each direction. To support these frequencies, a minimum of four vehicles will be in operation at any one time. 

Most stops will include a number of lifts and escalators owing to the elevated nature of the people mover.

Design 
Due to its sensitive surroundings, the visual depth of the viaduct was considered and reduced such as through reducing the depth of the walkway, placing its beams alongside the track.

All stops will incorporate common design elements through the route such as through lifts, escalators, and platform design. They will also incorporate a different coloured structural ribbon at each stop, wrapping through from the entrances to the platforms, to aid way-finding and for weather protection.

References 

High Speed 2
Transport in Birmingham, West Midlands
Solihull
Airport people mover systems in the United Kingdom